Foundations of Burden is the second full-length album by the American doom metal band Pallbearer. It was released on August 19, 2014 by Profound Lore Records. On June 24, 2014, the track  "The Ghost I Used to Be" from the album was made available for streaming on NPR, and can be purchased as a digital download from the band's Bandcamp site.

Track listing
All songs written and composed by Pallbearer.

Personnel
 Brett Campbell - lead vocals, guitar, composer, lyricist
 Devin Holt - guitar, auxiliary vocals on songs 1 & 3 
 Joseph D. Rowland - bass guitar, piano/Rhodes/analog synthesizer, auxiliary vocals on songs 1 & 4, lead vocals on song 5, lyricist, composer
 Mark Lierly - drums
 Billy Anderson - Engineer, Producer
 Chimere Noire - Layout
 Erin Pierce - Photography
 Rohan Sforcina - Studio Assistant
 Justin Weis - Mastering
 Diana Lee Zadlo - Band Photo

Chart positions

References

2014 albums
Profound Lore Records albums
Pallbearer (band) albums